The 2010–11 Charlotte Bobcats season was the 21st season of NBA Basketball in Charlotte in the National Basketball Association (NBA), and their 7th as the Charlotte Bobcats.

Key dates
 June 24: The 2010 NBA draft took place in New York City.
 July 1 – The free agency period begun.

Offseason

2010 NBA draft

Free agency

Roster

Pre-season

Game log

|- bgcolor="#ffcccc"
| 1
| October 5
| @ Cleveland
| 
| D. J. Augustin (14)
| Gerald Wallace (9)
| Boris Diaw (4)
| Quicken Loans Arenan/a
| 0–1
|- bgcolor="#ffcccc"
| 2
| October 6
| Oklahoma City
| 
| Tyrus Thomas (16)
| Tyrus Thomas (7)
| D. J. Augustin (6)
| Crown Coliseum7,491
| 0–2
|- bgcolor="#ffcccc"
| 3
| October 9
| @ Milwaukee
| 
| Gerald Wallace (15)
| Darius Miles (7)
| Gerald Wallace (5)
| Resch Center5,467
| 0–3
|- bgcolor="#ffcccc"
| 4
| October 14
| @ Orlando
| 
| D. J. Augustin (17)
| Boris Diaw (7)
| D. J. Augustin (4)
| Amway Center18,846
| 0–4
|- bgcolor="#ccffcc"
| 5
| October 16
| Detroit
| 
| Tyrus Thomas (23)
| Tyrus Thomas (7)
| D. J. Augustin (8)
| Colonial Life Arena6,847
| 1–4
|- bgcolor="#ccffcc"
| 6
| October 18
| @ Miami
| 
| D. J. Augustin (19)
| Gerald Henderson (6)
| Stephen Jackson (6)
| American Airlines Arena18,557
| 2–4
|- bgcolor="#ccffcc"
| 7
| October 20
| New Orleans
| 
| Stephen Jackson (25)
| Gerald Wallace (13)
| Boris Diaw (7)
| Time Warner Cable Arena19,077
| 3–4
|- bgcolor="#ccffcc"
| 8
| October 22
| Atlanta
| 
| Stephen Jackson (21)
| Stephen Jackson,Gerald Wallace,Derrick Brown (8)
| D. J. Augustin (5)
| Time Warner Cable Arena8,849
| 4–4
|-

Regular season

Standings

Record vs. opponents

Game log

|- bgcolor="#ffcccc"
| 1
| October 27
| @ Dallas
| 
| Tyrus Thomas (22)
| Gerald Wallace (9)
| D. J. Augustin (5)
| American Airlines Center19,440
| 0–1
|- bgcolor="#ffcccc"
| 2
| October 29    
| Indiana
| 
| Gerald Wallace (29)
| Boris Diaw (8)
| D. J. Augustin,Stephen Jackson (6)
| Time Warner Cable Arena18,351
| 0–2
|- bgcolor="#ffcccc"
| 3
| October 30
| @ Milwaukee
| 
| D. J. Augustin (26)
| Tyrus Thomas (7)
| D. J. Augustin (5)
| Bradley Center16,519
| 0–3
|-

|- bgcolor="#ccffcc"
| 4
| November 3
| @ New Jersey
| 
| Boris Diaw (24)
| Gerald Wallace (11)
| D. J. Augustin (7)
| Prudential Center11,778
| 1–3
|- bgcolor="#ffcccc"
| 5
| November 5
| @ Detroit
| 
| Stephen Jackson (28)
| Boris Diaw,Derrick Brown (7)
| D. J. Augustin (8)
| The Palace of Auburn Hills13,291
| 1–4
|- bgcolor="#ffcccc"
| 6
| November 6
| Orlando
| 
| Gerald Wallace (25)
| Gerald Wallace (14)
| D. J. Augustin (8)
| Time Warner Cable Arena18,136
| 1–5
|- bgcolor="#ffcccc"
| 7
| November 8
| San Antonio
| 
| Tyrus Thomas (16)
| Tyrus Thomas (8)
| D. J. Augustin (6)
| Time Warner Cable Arena14,152
| 1–6
|- bgcolor="#ccffcc"
| 8
| November 10
| @ Toronto
| 
| Stephen Jackson (20)
| Gerald Wallace (14)
| D. J. Augustin (7)
| Air Canada Centre14,309
| 2–6
|- bgcolor="#ccffcc"
| 9
| November 12
| @ Washington
| 
| Gerald Wallace (25)
| Gerald Wallace (14)
| D. J. Augustin (10)
| Verizon Center14,855
| 3–6
|- bgcolor="#ffcccc"
| 10
| November 13
| Utah
| 
| Stephen Jackson (24)
| Nazr Mohammed (20)
| D. J. Augustin (10)
| Time Warner Cable Arena15,486
| 3–7
|- bgcolor="#ccffcc"
| 11
| November 15
| Minnesota
| 
| Stephen Jackson,Gerald Wallace (26)
| Tyrus Thomas (10)
| D. J. Augustin (11)
| Time Warner Cable Arena11,211
| 4–7
|- bgcolor="#ffcccc"
| 12
| November 19
| @ Miami
| 
| Stephen Jackson (30)
| Gerald Wallace (9)
| Boris Diaw (7)
| American Airlines Arena19,600
| 4–8
|- bgcolor="#ccffcc"
| 13
| November 20
| Phoenix
| 
| Boris Diaw (26)
| Stephen Jackson (10)
| Stephen Jackson (10)
| Time Warner Cable Arena16,428
| 5–8
|- bgcolor="#ffcccc"
| 14
| November 23
| @ New York
| 
| D. J. Augustin (24)
| Gerald Wallace (8)
| D. J. Augustin (7)
| Madison Square Garden19,763
| 5–9
|- bgcolor="#ffcccc"
| 15
| November 24
| New York
| 
| Tyrus Thomas (26)
| Tyrus Thomas (11)
| D. J. Augustin (7)
| Time Warner Cable Arena15,588
| 5–10
|- bgcolor="#ccffcc"
| 16
| November 26
| Houston
| 
| Gerald Wallace (21)
| Gerald Wallace (14)
| D. J. Augustin (11)
| Time Warner Cable Arena16,473
| 6–10
|- bgcolor="#ffcccc"
| 17
| November 27
| @ Milwaukee
| 
| D. J. Augustin (26)
| Dominic McGuire (15)
| D. J. Augustin (6)
| Bradley Center15,213
| 6–11
|-

|- bgcolor="#ffcccc"
| 18
| December 1
| @ New Orleans
| 
| Gerald Wallace (18)
| Tyrus Thomas (10)
| D. J. Augustin (6)
| New Orleans Arena10,866
| 6–12
|- bgcolor="#ccffcc"
| 19
| December 3
| New Jersey
| 
| Stephen Jackson (25)
| Boris Diaw (16)
| Boris Diaw (8)
| Time Warner Cable Arena12,183
| 7–12
|- bgcolor="#ffcccc"
| 20
| December 4
| @ Philadelphia
| 
| Boris Diaw (19)
| Kwame Brown (7)
| Boris Diaw (6)
| Wells Fargo Center14,611
| 7–13
|- bgcolor="#ccffcc"
| 21
| December 7
| Denver
| 
| Stephen Jackson (23)
| Stephen Jackson,Gerald Wallace (9)
| Stephen Jackson (7)
| Time Warner Cable Arena15,737
| 8–13
|- bgcolor="#ffcccc"
| 22
| December 10
| @ Indiana
| 
| Gerald Wallace (26)
| Gerald Wallace (13)
| Stephen Jackson (8)
| Conseco Fieldhouse13,128
| 8–14
|- bgcolor="#ffcccc"
| 23
| December 11
| Boston
| 
| Nazr Mohammed (14)
| Kwame Brown (9)
| Stephen Jackson (7)
| Time Warner Cable Arena19,603
| 8–15
|- bgcolor="#ccffcc"
| 24
| December 14
| Toronto
| 
| Nazr Mohammed (18)
| Nazr Mohammed (8)
| D. J. Augustin (7)
| Time Warner Cable Arena12,482
| 9–15
|- bgcolor="#ffcccc"
| 25
| December 15
| @ Memphis
| 
| Stephen Jackson (16)
| Dominic McGuire (7)
| D. J. Augustin (7)
| FedExForum12,219
| 9–16
|- bgcolor="#ffcccc"
| 26
| December 17
| @ Atlanta
| 
| D. J. Augustin,Boris Diaw (22)
| Dominic McGuire (17)
| Shaun Livingston (5)
| Philips Arena15,006
| 9–17
|- bgcolor="#ffcccc"
| 27
| December 20
| @ Washington
| 
| Stephen Jackson (13)
| Boris Diaw (7)
| D. J. Augustin,Boris Diaw (4)
| Verizon Center13,825
| 9–18
|- bgcolor="#ffcccc"
| 28
| December 21
| Oklahoma City
| 
| Stephen Jackson (20)
| Boris Diaw (7)
| Boris Diaw (8)
| Time Warner Cable Arena16,876
| 9–19
|- bgcolor="#ccffcc"
| 29
| December 27
| Detroit
| 
| D. J. Augustin (27)
| Stephen Jackson (9)
| Boris Diaw (6)
| Time Warner Cable Arena14,418
| 10–19
|- bgcolor="#ccffcc"
| 30
| December 29
| Cleveland
| 
| Stephen Jackson (38)
| Gerald Wallace (10)
| D. J. Augustin (6)
| Time Warner Cable Arena15,287
| 11–19
|- bgcolor="#ffcccc"
| 31
| December 31
| Golden State
| 
| Stephen Jackson (22)
| Dominic McGuire,Nazr Mohammed,Gerald Wallace (8)
| D. J. Augustin (6)
| Time Warner Cable Arena16,249
| 11–20
|-

|- bgcolor="#ffcccc"
| 32
| January 3
| Miami
| 
| Stephen Jackson (22)
| Kwame Brown,Dominic McGuire (7)
| Boris Diaw,Stephen Jackson (5)
| Time Warner Cable Arena19,233
| 11–21
|- bgcolor="#ccffcc"
| 33
| January 5
| @ Minnesota
| 
| Tyrus Thomas (21)
| Kwame Brown (14)
| D. J. Augustin (8)
| Target Center14,881
| 12–21
|- bgcolor="#ccffcc"
| 34
| January 8
| Washington
| 
| Stephen Jackson (21)
| Boris Diaw,Stephen Jackson (10)
| D. J. Augustin (9)
| Time Warner Cable Arena16,038
| 13–21
|- bgcolor="#ccffcc"
| 35
| January 10
| Memphis
| 
| Stephen Jackson (27)
| Boris Diaw (9)
| D. J. Augustin (9)
| Time Warner Cable Arena10,188
| 14–21
|- bgcolor="#ccffcc"
| 36
| January 12
| Chicago
| 
| D. J. Augustin (22)
| Tyrus Thomas (13)
| D. J. Augustin (12)
| Time Warner Cable Arena12,468
| 15–21
|- bgcolor="#ffcccc"
| 37
| January 14
| @ Boston
| 
| Gerald Wallace (20)
| Tyrus Thomas (9)
| D. J. Augustin (6)
| TD Garden18,624
| 15–22
|- bgcolor="#ffcccc"
| 38
| January 15
| New Orleans
| 
| Stephen Jackson,Gerald Wallace (15)
| Kwame Brown (14)
| D. J. Augustin (7)
| Time Warner Cable Arena17,486
| 15–23
|- bgcolor="#ffcccc"
| 39
| January 17
| @ Philadelphia
| 
| Boris Diaw (25)
| Kwame Brown (16)
| Boris Diaw (11)
| Wells Fargo Center13,508
| 15–24
|- bgcolor="#ccffcc"
| 40
| January 18
| @ Chicago
| 
| D. J. Augustin (15)
| Gerald Wallace (16)
| D. J. Augustin (5)
| United Center21,263
| 16–24
|- bgcolor="#ccffcc"
| 41
| January 20
| Philadelphia
| 
| D. J. Augustin (31)
| Kwame Brown (9)
| D. J. Augustin (8)
| Time Warner Cable Arena14,326
| 17–24
|- bgcolor="#ffcccc"
| 42
| January 22
| Atlanta
| 
| D. J. Augustin (20)
| Gerald Wallace (8)
| D. J. Augustin (7)
| Time Warner Cable Arena17,286
| 17–25
|- bgcolor="#ccffcc"
| 43
| January 25
| @ Sacramento
| 
| Stephen Jackson (21)
| Kwame Brown (18)
| Shaun Livingston (3)
| ARCO Arena13,984
| 18–25
|- bgcolor="#ccffcc"
| 44
| January 26
| @ Phoenix
| 
| Stephen Jackson (23)
| Kwame Brown,Gerald Wallace (10)
| D. J. Augustin (10)
| US Airways Center16,986
| 19–25
|- bgcolor="#ccffcc"
| 45
| January 28
| @ Golden State
| 
| Stephen Jackson (31)
| Stephen Jackson (7)
| D. J. Augustin (12)
| Oracle Arena18,407
| 20–25
|- bgcolor="#ffcccc"
| 46
| January 29
| @ L.A. Clippers
| 
| Gerald Henderson,Stephen Jackson (14)
| Kwame Brown (12)
| Boris Diaw (5)
| Staples Center18,332
| 20–26
|- bgcolor="#ffcccc"
| 47
| January 31
| @ Utah
| 
| Stephen Jackson (24)
| D. J. Augustin,Stephen Jackson (8)
| D. J. Augustin (7)
| EnergySolutions Arena19,499
| 20–27
|-

|- bgcolor="#ccffcc"
| 48
| February 2
| @ Detroit
| 
| Stephen Jackson (39)
| Kwame Brown (10)
| Boris Diaw (9)
| The Palace of Auburn Hills14,376
| 21–27
|- bgcolor="#ffcccc"
| 49
| February 4
| Miami
| 
| Stephen Jackson,Gerald Wallace (25)
| Gerald Wallace (10)
| D. J. Augustin (8)
| Time Warner Cable Arena19,592
| 21–28
|- bgcolor="#ffcccc"
| 50
| February 5
| Dallas
| 
| D. J. Augustin (21)
| Gerald Wallace (11)
| Stephen Jackson (5)
| Time Warner Cable Arena17,743
| 21–29
|- bgcolor="#ccffcc"
| 51
| February 7
| Boston
| 
| Gerald Wallace (19)
| Gerald Wallace (16)
| D. J. Augustin (4)
| Time Warner Cable Arena19,081
| 22–29
|- bgcolor="#ffcccc"
| 52
| February 9
| @ Indiana
| 
| Stephen Jackson (27)
| Gerald Wallace (9)
| Gerald Wallace (6)
| Conseco Fieldhouse10,268
| 22–30
|- bgcolor="#ffcccc"
| 53
| February 11
| New Jersey
| 
| Stephen Jackson (21)
| Gerald Wallace (9)
| Boris Diaw,Stephen Jackson (4)
| Time Warner Cable Arena15,386
| 22–31
|- bgcolor="#ccffcc"
| 54
| February 12
| @ Atlanta
| 
| Stephen Jackson (32)
| Gerald Wallace (13)
| Gerald Wallace (7)
| Philips Arena16,948
| 23–31
|- bgcolor="#ccffcc"
| 55
| February 14
| L.A. Lakers
| 
| Gerald Wallace (20)
| Gerald Wallace (11)
| D. J. Augustin (9)
| Time Warner Cable Arena19,488
| 24–31
|- bgcolor="#ffcccc"
| 56
| February 15
| @ Chicago
| 
| Gerald Henderson (22)
| Gerald Wallace (8)
| Stephen Jackson (6)
| United Center21,391
| 24–32
|- align="center"
|colspan="9" bgcolor="#bbcaff"|All-Star Break
|- bgcolor="#ccffcc"
| 57
| February 22
| Toronto
| 
| D. J. Augustin (23)
| Nazr Mohammed (14)
| Boris Diaw (9)
| Time Warner Cable Arena12,976
| 25–32
|- bgcolor="#ccffcc"
| 58
| February 25
| Sacramento
| 
| Stephen Jackson (30)
| Kwame Brown (13)
| Shaun Livingston (5)
| Time Warner Cable Arena15,782
| 26–32
|- bgcolor="#ffcccc"
| 59
| February 27
| @ Orlando
| 
| Stephen Jackson (35)
| Boris Diaw (9)
| D. J. Augustin (4)
| Amway Center18,846
| 26–33
|-

|- bgcolor="#ffcccc"
| 60
| March 2
| @ Denver
| 
| Matt Carroll (19)
| Boris Diaw (6)
| Shaun Livingston (7)
| Pepsi Center14,255
| 26–34
|- bgcolor="#ffcccc"
| 61
| March 4
| @ L.A. Lakers
| 
| D. J. Augustin (22)
| Dominic McGuire,Joel Przybilla (8)
| D. J. Augustin,Shaun Livingston (4)
| Staples Center18,997
| 26–35
|- bgcolor="#ffcccc"
| 62
| March 5
| @ Portland
| 
| Gerald Henderson (16)
| D. J. White (9)
| Boris Diaw (5)
| Rose Garden20,588
| 26–36
|- bgcolor="#ffcccc"
| 63
| March 7
| L.A. Clippers
| 
| Gerald Henderson (20)
| Boris Diaw (8)
| Boris Diaw (8)
| Time Warner Cable Arena16,438
| 26–37
|- bgcolor="#ffcccc"
| 64
| March 9
| Chicago
| 
| Gerald Henderson (20)
| Kwame Brown (11)
| Gerald Henderson (8)
| Time Warner Cable Arena15,286
| 26–38
|- bgcolor="#ccffcc"
| 65
| March 11
| Portland
| 
| Stephen Jackson (29)
| Stephen Jackson (10)
| D. J. Augustin (5)
| Time Warner Cable Arena18,176
| 27–38
|- bgcolor="#ccffcc"
| 66
| March 13
| @ Toronto
| 
| D. J. Augustin (23)
| Kwame Brown,Stephen Jackson (5)
| Boris Diaw (6)
| Air Canada Centre16,557
| 28–38
|- bgcolor="#ffcccc"
| 67
| March 16
| @ Houston
| 
| D. J. Augustin (22)
| Kwame Brown,D. J. White (6)
| D. J. Augustin,Stephen Jackson (4)
| Toyota Center14,822
| 28–39
|- bgcolor="#ffcccc"
| 68
| March 18
| @ Oklahoma City
| 
| Stephen Jackson (18)
| Kwame Brown (8)
| D. J. Augustin (8)
| Oklahoma City Arena18,203
| 28–40
|- bgcolor="#ffcccc"
| 69
| March 19
| @ San Antonio
| 
| Gerald Henderson (19)
| Kwame Brown (7)
| Shaun Livingston (8)
| AT&T Center19,075
| 28–41
|- bgcolor="#ffcccc"
| 70
| March 23
| Indiana
| 
| D. J. Augustin (17)
| Kwame Brown (9)
| Boris Diaw (7)
| Time Warner Cable Arena14,703
| 28–42
|- bgcolor="#ccffcc"
| 71
| March 25
| @ Boston
| 
| D. J. White (17)
| Kwame Brown,Dominic McGuire (7)
| D. J. Augustin (4)
| TD Garden18,624
| 29–42
|- bgcolor="#ccffcc"
| 72
| March 26
| New York
| 
| Boris Diaw (20)
| Boris Diaw (8)
| D. J. Augustin (9)
| Time Warner Cable Arena19,356
| 30–42
|- bgcolor="#ccffcc"
| 73
| March 28
| Milwaukee
| 
| Stephen Jackson (18)
| Tyrus Thomas (6)
| D. J. Augustin,Boris Diaw (8)
| Time Warner Cable Arena12,368
| 31–42
|- bgcolor="#ccffcc"
| 74
| March 30
| Cleveland
| 
| Boris Diaw (26)
| Kwame Brown (8)
| D. J. Augustin (12)
| Time Warner Cable Arena12,584
| 32–42
|-

|- bgcolor="#ffcccc"
| 75
| April 1
| @ Orlando
| 
| Dante Cunningham (21)
| Kwame Brown (11)
| D. J. Augustin,Boris Diaw (6)
| Amway Center18,969
| 32–43
|- bgcolor="#ffcccc"
| 76
| April 3
| Washington
| 
| Matt Carroll (26)
| D. J. White (8)
| D. J. Augustin (7)
| Time Warner Cable Arena16,444
| 32–44
|- bgcolor="#ffcccc"
| 77
| April 5
| @ Cleveland
| 
| D. J. Augustin (22)
| Dante Cunningham,Boris Diaw (11)
| D. J. Augustin (8)
| Quicken Loans Arena19,835
| 32–45
|- bgcolor="#ffcccc"
| 78
| April 6
| Orlando
| 
| Gerald Henderson (32)
| Dante Cunningham (10)
| Boris Diaw (9)
| Time Warner Cable Arena16,234
| 32–46
|- bgcolor="#ffcccc"
| 79
| April 8
| @ Miami
| 
| Kwame Brown (23)
| Kwame Brown (13)
| Dominic McGuire (3)
| American Airlines Arena19,897
| 32–47
|- bgcolor="#ffcccc"
| 80
| April 10
| Detroit
| 
| Gerald Henderson (21)
| Kwame Brown (7)
| D. J. Augustin (14)
| Time Warner Cable Arena16,234
| 32–48
|- bgcolor="#ccffcc"
| 81
| April 11
| @ New Jersey
| 
| Dante Cunningham (21)
| Kwame Brown (7)
| D. J. Augustin (10)
| Prudential Center13,853
| 33–48
|- bgcolor="#ccffcc"
| 82
| April 13
| Atlanta
| 
| Gerald Henderson (20)
| Kwame Brown (8)
| Boris Diaw (9)
| Time Warner Cable Arena16,138
| 34–48
|-

Playoffs

Game log

Player statistics

Regular season

|- align="center" bgcolor=""
|  || style="background:#F26532;color:white;" | 74 || style="background:#F26532;color:white;" | 74 || 33.3 || .418 || .332 || style="background:#F26532;color:white;" | .910 || 2.8 || style="background:#F26532;color:white;" | 5.9 || .58 || .04 || 14.2
|- align="center" bgcolor="#f0f0f0"
| * || 41 || 1 || 11.9 || style="background:#F26532;color:white;" | .549 || .333 || .532 || 2.0 || 0.7 || .40 || .20 || 3.7
|- align="center" bgcolor=""
|  || 58 || 42 || 24.4 || .495 || .0 || .594 || 6.8 || 0.5 || .33 || .55 || 7.4
|- align="center" bgcolor="#f0f0f0"
|  || 46 || 1 || 10.0 || .416 || style="background:#F26532;color:white;" | .343 || .784 || 1.3 || 0.4 || .33 || .09 || 3.7
|- align="center" bgcolor=""
|  || 20 || 0 || 3.3 || .280 || .200 || 1.000 || 0.3 || 0.4 || .10 || .0 || 0.9
|- align="center" bgcolor="#f0f0f0"
| * || 14 || 1 || 19.1 || .532 || .000 || .769 || 2.9 || 0.3 || .57 || .43 || 6.7
|- align="center" bgcolor=""
|  || style="background:#F26532;color:white;" | 74 || style="background:#F26532;color:white;" | 74 || 33.6 || .489 || .337 || .673 || 5.1 || 3.9 || .88 || .55 || 11.1
|- align="center" bgcolor="#f0f0f0"
|  || 16 || 0 || 11.3 || .333 || .0 || .364 || 2.5 || 0.4 || .25 || .94 || 1.3
|- align="center" bgcolor=""
|  || 60 || 22 || 23.0 || .456 || .130 || .768 || 2.9 || 1.2 || .65 || .48 || 8.7
|- align="center" bgcolor="#f0f0f0"
|  || 67 || 67 || 35.9 || .411 || .337 || .816 || 4.5 || 3.6 || 1.19 || .42 || style="background:#F26532;color:white;" | 18.5
|- align="center" bgcolor=""
|  || 73 || 0 || 17.3 || .466 || .250 || .864 || 2.0 || 2.2 || .64 || .40 || 6.6
|- align="center" bgcolor="#f0f0f0"
|  || 44 || 8 || 14.0 || .387 || .000 || .690 || 3.8 || 0.8 || .23 || .57 || 3.1
|- align="center" bgcolor=""
| * || 51 || 30 || 16.7 || .502 || .000 || .591 || 4.9 || 0.3 || .30 || .90 || 7.3
|- align="center" bgcolor="#f0f0f0"
|  || 31 || 0 || 12.0 || .361 || .324 || .545 || 1.4 || 0.6 || .35 || .19 || 2.2
|- align="center" bgcolor=""
| * || 5 || 0 || 14.8 || .400 || .0 || .250 || 4.8 || 0.0 || .0 || .20 || 1.8
|- align="center" bgcolor="#f0f0f0"
| * || 4 || 0 || 7.0 || .143 || .200 || .0 || 1.3 || 1.0 || .50 || .25 || 0.8
|- align="center" bgcolor=""
|  || 41 || 2 || 21.0 || .471 || .000 || .787 || 5.5 || 0.7 || .73 || style="background:#F26532;color:white;" | 1.61 || 10.2
|- align="center" bgcolor="#f0f0f0"
| * || 48 || 48 || style="background:#F26532;color:white;" | 39.0 || .433 || .330 || .739 || style="background:#F26532;color:white;" | 8.2 || 2.4 || style="background:#F26532;color:white;" | 1.20 || 1.00 || 15.6
|- align="center" bgcolor=""
| * || 16 || 0 || 19.6 || .546 || .000 || .789 || 4.4 || 0.4 || .31 || .56 || 8.5
|}
As of March 31.
* – Stats with the Bobcats.

Playoffs

Awards, records and milestones

Awards

Week/Month

All-Star

Season

Records

Milestones

Injuries and surgeries
 Stephen Jackson with Hamstring injury

Transactions

Trades

Free agents

Additions

Subtractions

References

Charlotte Bobcats seasons
Charlotte
Bob
Bob